Meridian 3, also known as Meridian No.13L, was a Russian communications satellite. It was the third satellite to be launched as part of the Meridian system to replace the older Molniya series.

Meridian 3 was launched by a Soyuz-2 rocket. The Soyuz-2.1a configuration was used, along with a Fregat-M upper stage. The launch occurred from Site 43/4 at the Plesetsk Cosmodrome at 00:58:39 GMT on 2 November 2010.

It was constructed by ISS Reshetnev and is believed to be based on the Uragan-M satellite bus, which has also been used for GLONASS navigation satellites.

References

External links

 Meridian 3 - NSSDC ID: 2010-058A
 N2YO Meridian-3 Tracking - Live Meridian-3 tracking

Spacecraft launched in 2010
Spacecraft launched by Soyuz-2 rockets
Meridian satellites
2010 in Russia